News Weekly is an Australian current affairs magazine, published by the National Civic Council, with its main headquarters in Balwyn, Victoria. It also has offices in Queensland, New South Wales, Western Australia and South Australia.

History and profile
News Weekly was founded by B. A. Santamaria and first published in September 1943, under the name Freedom. It later changed its name to Australia's national news-weekly, and adopted its current name in 1946–47.

News Weekly adheres to the five primacies of the National Civic Council: "natural family as the basic unit of society", decentralisation, "integrity of the individual", patriotism, and "Judeo-Christian virtues".

According to the Kempsey Library listing, News Weekly provides analysis of current cultural, social, political, educational, and economic trends in Australia, focusing on ethics.

In 1955, it had a circulation of 30,000 copies.

Associated groups include the Thomas More Centre and the Australian Family Association.
Controversy and conflict with other political groups prevailed over time.

Publication details 

 Frequency: 25 issues per year.
 Pages: 28
 Pricing/Ordering: from $2/day to $120/year.
 Delivery/Distribution: worldwide.

The editor is Peter Kelleher and the publisher is Freedom Publishing Company Pty Ltd.
Microform: 
 Online: 
 Printed:

References

External links
 Official website

1943 establishments in Australia
Biweekly magazines published in Australia
Conservative magazines
Conservatism in Australia
English-language magazines
Magazines established in 1943
Mass media in Victoria (Australia)
News magazines published in Australia
Weekly magazines published in Australia
Conservative media in Australia